An Unremarkable Life is a 1989 American drama film directed by Amin Q. Chaudhri and starring Patricia Neal and Shelley Winters.

Cast
Patricia Neal as Frances McEllany
Shelley Winters as Evelyn McEllany
Mako as Max Chin
Rochelle Oliver as Mary Alice
Charles S. Dutton as Lou

Release
The film premiered theatrically in New York City on October 12, 1989.

Reception
Rita Kempley of The Washington Post gave the film a negative review and called it "an embarrassment for venerable Patricia Neal, who stars with hambone Shelley Winters, who blushes at nothing."

Michael Wilmington of the Los Angeles Times gave the film a mixed review and wrote, "we get a mostly unremarkable pastiche--in which three fine actors manage, occasionally, to shine."

Steve Simels of Entertainment Weekly also gave the film a mixed review and wrote, "In short, An Unremarkable Life is a sleeper in the literal sense of the term."

References

External links
 
 

American drama films
1980s English-language films
1980s American films
1989 drama films